Petro Palyvoda (1959, Volyn) —  Ukrainian and Esperanto poet and translator, lives in Kyiv region, Ukraine.  Some works have been translated and published in German, Croatian and Italian.

Languages
At different times, his works written in different languages: 
Ukrainian, Esperanto, Russian, German, 
and translations from German, Spanish, Esperanto and Russian into Ukrainian and from Ukrainian to Esperanto, 
were published in newspapers, magazines, almanacs, anthologies in Ukraine, Russia, Lithuania, Czech Republic, Slovakia, Switzerland, Romania, the US, Australia, China, Costa Rica, Poland, Canada, Turkey, Croatia, Korea, Hungary, Israel, France, Japan and Brazil.

He translated the poetry from Ukrainian to  Esperanto of such poets: 
 
 Lesia Ukrainka
 Oleksandr Oles
 Andrii Malyshko 
 Oleksa Slisarenko
 Vasyl Atamaniuk
 Dmytro Lutsenko
 Volodymyr Dankevych
 Larysa Mandziuk
 Yurii Rybchynskyi
 Bohdana Yehorova
 Mariia Mykytsei
 Daryna Shevchuk
 Ukrainian folk songs

As well as he translated the poetry from Esperanto to Ukrainian of such poets:

 William Auld
 Albert Goodheir
 Baldur Ragnarsson
 Mauro Nervi
 Ludwik Zamenhof
 Hilda Dresen
 Victor Sadler
 Vasyl Eroshenko
 Alexander Logvin
 Eugeniusz Matkowski
 Aivar Liepins
 Julia Zigmond
 Zhomart Amzyeyev
 Julio Baghy
 Julián Marchena (from Spanish to Ukrainian)
 Martin Kirchhoff (from German into Ukrainian)
 Tetiana Chernetska (from Russian into Ukrainian) 

And translated the prose of: 
 
 Kalle Kniivilä (from Esperanto into Ukrainian and Russian)
 Ulrich Becker (from Esperanto into Ukrainian)
 Guido Hernandez Marin (from Esperanto into Ukrainian) 
 Anton Meiser (from German into Ukrainian)
 Manfred Welzel (from German into Ukrainian)
 Khrystyna Kozlovska (from Ukrainian to Esperanto and to German)
 Bohdana Yehorova (from Ukrainian to Esperanto and to German)

Awards

Winner of 
the international literary contest in Esperanto (poetry) "Liro-1982" Kaliningrad, Russia (3rd prize)
the international literary contest in Esperanto (poetry) "EKRA-2006", Razgrad, Bulgaria (1st prize) 
Ukrainian literary contest "Rukomeslo 2006", Kyiv (poetry - 3rd prize, translation - 2nd prize)
winner of the XVII Ukrainian festival of Ukrainian modern pop songs "Song Vernissage-2006" (the author of the laureate lyrics) 
winner of the All-Ukrainian literary and musical contest "Inspiro" in the branches of "Original poetry" and "Translated poetry" (Kolomyia, 2015) 
winner of the International poetry contest "Una ballata per l'Esperanto" (Messina, Italy, 2019)
winner of the international translation contest (poetry) "Lucija Borčić", Croatia, 2020 (3rd prize)
winner of the international musical contest "Ĝanfranko", Italy, 2021 (1st and 2nd prizes)
a winner (in co-authorship) of the All-Ukrainian literary competition "Mein Erinnerungsort" ("Place of my memory") of the German-Ukrainian cultural and educational center "Nürnberger Haus" in 2021 (special prize).

His literary works have been translated to German, Croatian, Italian, Corean and French.

From 2004 to 2012 he was a member of the jury of the international competition of literary works and translations in Esperanto "Liro".

Music
Petro Palyvoda is a songwriter. His poems were set to music by composers: 
 
 Valerii Tytarenko
 Leonid Popernatskyi
 Ivan Pustovyi
 Yurii Krombet
 Dmytro Zubko
 Hennadii Volodko
 Viktor Okhrimchuk
 Biagio Ilacqua (Italy)
 JoMo (Jean-Marc Leclercq) (France)
 Antero Avila (Portugal)
 Feri Floro (Germany)
 Liven Dek (Spain) (Spain)
 Christian Departe (France)

His songs were and are performed by Ukrainian singers and bands: 
 
 Yurii Rozhkov
 Pavlo Mrezhuk
 Markiian Sviato
 Yurii Krombet
 Dmytro Kostrov
 Serhii Nykonenko
 Serhii Rozumnyi
 Oleksandr Drahomoshchenko
 Olena Myshliakovska
 Natalia Kaskova
 Star Dream
 Stefaniia Okseniuk
 Ĵomart kaj Nataŝa (Sweden)
 Romilda Mangraviti (Italy)
 JoMo (France)
 Alta Tajdo (Portugal)
 Grinoalda and Maria Avila (Portugal)
 Feri Floro (Germany)
 Amira Chun (Korea)
 MoKo (France)

References

 (Ukrainian) Laureat of Song Vernissage-2006

External links
Translation of a poem by Julián Marchena

1959 births
Ukrainian translators
Ukrainian poets
Living people
Ukrainian Esperantists